Inma Serrano is a Spanish singer-songwriter. Serrano was born in Alicante, Spain, in 1968.

She has lived in Alicante, Valencia, Barcelona, and Madrid. In 2003, she created the record label  "Cerebro Demente Records". With this record company, she released "Soy capaz y pequeñas joyas" with collaborations of Mercedes Ferrer, Tontxu, Jerry Fish, Armando y el Expreso de Bohemia, Mai Meneses and Anthony Blake. She has taken part in several TV programmes and humanitarian projects such as "Cuarto mundo" (2006).

Discography 
1995 – Inma Serrano
1997 – Cantos de sirena
1999 – Rosas de papel
2003 – Soy capaz y pequeñas joyas
2004 – Grandes éxitos
2006 – Polvo de estrellas (CD/DVD)
2008 – Inma I (in Catalan)
2009 – Inma II (in Spanish)
2010 – Voy a ser sincera

External links
Official Website
 Cuarto Mundo

1968 births
Living people
People from Alicante
Singers from the Valencian Community
Spanish women singers
Catalan-language singers
Spanish songwriters